Arun Kumar (born 21 September 1986), known mononymously as Atlee, is an Indian film director, screenwriter and producer best known for his work in Tamil films. 

He initially worked as an assistant director under S. Shankar in the films Enthiran (2010) and Nanban (2012). He made his directorial debut with the film Raja Rani starring Nayanthara , Nazriya, Arya and Jai, produced by Fox Star Studios, for which he was awarded Best Debut Director by Vijay Award and Tamil Nadu State award for best dialogue writer. Following the success of his debut film, he went on to direct his next film Theri (2016) starring actor Vijay as the lead.

He directed his films Mersal (2017) and Bigil (2019), also featuring actor Vijay. Atlee's upcoming film is Jawan (2023) starring Shah Rukh Khan.

Career

Atlee began his career at the age of 19, as an assistant director to director S. Shankar for the films Enthiran (2010) and  Nanban (2012), a remake of the Hindi film 3 Idiots. His short film Mugaputhagam (2011) received a massive response from the public and throughout various media platforms. In 2013, Atlee went on to make his directorial debut with Raja Rani, a romantic comedy film, produced by AR Murugadoss, Fox star studios and Next Big Films, starring Arya, Jai, Nayanthara, Nazriya Nazim and Sathyaraj. Raja Rani earned over 150 crores at the box office and won him the Best Debut Director award from Vijay Awards.

Following Raja Rani 's success, Atlee went on to direct his next hit film Theri ( 2016 ) an emotional action thriller, produced by Kalaipuli S. Thanu , starring actor Vijay , Samantha and Amy Jackson in the lead roles. The film released worldwide receiving positive reviews from critics who praised the cast performances, soundtrack and the making of the film. Grossing over 250 crores at the box office, the film emerged as a commercial success and became the second highest grossing Tamil and South Indian film of 2016. It further won three SIIMA awards, three IIFA Utsavam awards and nine nominations at the 64th Filmfare awards south. 

In 2017, Atlee went on to direct Mersal , an action film, produced by Thenandal Studio Ltd. starring Vijay, and Nithya Menen while S. J. Surya, Sathyaraj, Vadivelu, Hareesh Peradi, Kajal Aggarwal, Samantha Ruth Prabhu and Kovai Sarala appear in pivotal supporting roles. The film was a commercial success becoming one of the highest-grossing films in Tamil cinema, grossing more than 360 crores worldwide. It is also a recipient of various accolades. The film was released on 6 December 2018 in China by HGC Entertainment. Due to demand, the film was screened at the largest cinema theatre in Europe Grand Rex, France. The film was screened at the Hainan International Film Festival in Hainan, China and at the Bucheon International Fantastic Film Festival in South Korea. 

Atlee soon directed his next film Bigil, an action film, produced by Kalpathi S. Aghoram under the banner AGS Entertainment. The film stars Vijay in the titular role along with Nayanthara, Jackie Shroff, Vivek and Kathir in other prominent roles. The film marked as the third collaboration of Vijay and Atlee after Theri and Mersal. The film has music composed by the Academy Award winning music composer A.R Rahman. Bigil emerged as the highest-grossing Tamil film of 2019, collecting ₹453 crore upon its release, it further became the one of the highest-grossing Tamil film of all time and Vijay's highest-grossing film in his career. The film also won two awards each at the Zee Cine Awards Tamil, Ananda Vikatan Cinema Awards, three Edison Awards and a SIIMA Award. 

He also ventured into producing films. In 2017, Atlee along with his wife Priya Atlee, started their own production house called " A for Apple Production ". and jointly produced their first film with Fox Star Studios. The film Sangili Bungili Kadhava Thorae, a horror comedy film is written and directed by Ike. The film stars Jiiva, Sri Divya, and Soori in the lead roles while Radha Ravi, Raadhika Sarathkumar, and Thambi Ramaiah play supporting roles. The film's music was composed by Vishal Chandrasekhar.

In 2020, A for Apple productions produced yet another film Andhaghaaram, a supernatural horror thriller film written and directed by V. Vignarajan. The film is produced by Priya Atlee, alongside Sudhan Sundaram and Jayaram under their banner Passion Studios and K. Poornachandra's O2 Pictures. The film stars Arjun Das, Vinoth Kishan, and Kumar Natarajan in lead roles along with Pooja Ramachandran and Misha Ghoshal in supporting roles. The film was released on Netflix on 24 November 2020.

Personal life
Atlee married actress Krishna Priya on 9 November 2014. He has a son who was born 31st January 2022

Filmography

As director, writer and producer

Guest appearances

Accolades

References

External links

 
 
 

Artists from Madurai
Living people
21st-century Indian film directors
Tamil-language film directors
South Indian International Movie Awards winners
1986 births